Cerreto Selva is a village in Tuscany, central Italy, located in the comune of Sovicille, province of Siena.

Cerreto Selva is about 10 km from Siena and 5 km from Sovicille.

Bibliography
 

Frazioni of Sovicille